Maurizio Mattioli (born  3 June 1950) is an Italian actor and comedian.

Life and career 
Born in Rome, Mattioli started his career in 1973, when he appeared in the RAI variety show Dove sta Zazà. He got his first successes as a member of the stage company "Il Bagaglino", with whom he worked in a number of stage and television projects between seventies and early nineties. Mattioli later established himself as one of the most active character actors in Italian cinema, and he was nominated twice in the best supporting actor category at the Nastro d'Argento, in 2003 for Carlo Vanzina's Sunday Lunch  and in 2011 for Paolo Genovese's The Immature.

References

External links 

1950 births
Male actors from Rome
Italian male stage actors
Italian male film actors
Italian male television actors
Living people